Gaotang is a town of Raoping County in far eastern Guangdong province, China, located about  northwest of the county seat along the western (right) bank of the Huanggang River (黄冈河), which empties into the South China Sea near the county seat. , it has 12 villages under its administration.

See also 
 List of township-level divisions of Guangdong

References 

Township-level divisions of Guangdong